Elapata is a genus of picture-winged flies in the family Ulidiidae.

Species
 E. remipes

References

Ulidiidae